The following outline is provided as an overview of and topical guide to C++:

C++ is a statically typed, free-form, multi-paradigm, compiled, general-purpose programming language. It is regarded as an intermediate-level language, as it comprises a combination of both high-level and low-level language features. It was developed by Bjarne Stroustrup starting in 1979 at Bell Labs as an enhancement to the C language.

What type of language is C++? 

C++ can be described as all of the following:

 Programming language — artificial language designed to communicate instructions to a machine, particularly a computer. Programming languages can be used to create programs that control the behavior of a machine and/or to express algorithms precisely.
 Compiled language — programming language implemented through compilers (translators which generate machine code from source code), and not interpreters (step-by-step executors of source code, where no translation takes place).
 General-purpose programming language — programming language designed to be used for writing software in a wide variety of application domains.
 Intermediate language — language of an abstract machine designed to aid in the analysis of computer programs. The term comes from their use in compilers, where a compiler first translates the source code of a program into a form more suitable for code-improving transformations, as an intermediate step before generating object or machine code for a target machine.
 Object-oriented programming language – programming language based on "objects", which are data structures that contain data, in the form of fields, often known as attributes; and code, in the form of procedures, known as methods. An object's procedures can access and modify the data fields of the objects. In object-oriented programming, computer programs are designed by making them out of objects that interact with one another.
 Statically typed programming language

General C++ concepts 

 Name resolution
 Argument-dependent name lookup — applies to the lookup of an unqualified function name depending on the types of the arguments given to the function call. This behavior is also known as Koenig lookup, named after its inventor Andrew Koenig (programmer).
 Auto-linking — mechanism for automatically determining which libraries to link to while building a C or C++ program. It is activated by means of #pragma comment(lib, <name>) statements in the header files of the library.
 Classes — Classes define types of data structures and the functions that operate on those data structures. Instances of these datatypes are known as objects and can contain member variables, constants, member functions, and overloaded operators defined by the programmer. The C++ programming language allows programmers to separate program-specific datatypes through the use of classes.
 Exception guarantees
 Header file
 Inner class
 One Definition Rule
 Opaque pointer
 Plain old data structure
 Rule of three (C++ programming)
 Run-time type information
 Sequence point
 Single compilation unit
 Special member functions
 Substitution failure is not an error
 Template (C++)
 Template metaprogramming
 Traits class
 Undefined behavior
 Virtual function calls

Issues 
 Compatibility of C and C++

C++ Toolchain

C++ compilers

C++ libraries

C++ Standard Library

The C++ standard library is a collection of utilities that are shipped with C++ for use by any C++ programmer.
It includes input and output, multi-threading, time, regular expressions, algorithms for common tasks, and less common ones (find, for_each, swap, etc.) and lists, maps and hash maps (and the equivalent for sets) and a class called vector that is a resizable array. Many other functions are provided by the standard library, but mainly in a form designed for building on top of to create third party libraries.
 Standard Template Library (STL)

Other notable libraries
 Active Template Library
 Adaptive Communication Environment
 Algorithmic skeleton
 Apache C++ Standard Library
 Armadillo (C++ library)
 Artefaktur
 Asio C++ library
 AT&T FSM Library
 ATL Server
 BALL
 Blitz++
 Boehm garbage collector
 Boost (C++ libraries)
 Borland Graphics Interface
 Botan (programming library)
 C++ AMP
 CGAL
 Cinder (programming library) — framework for advanced visualization capabilities.
 ClanLib
 CodeSynthesis XSD
 CodeSynthesis XSD/e
 CppUnit
 Crypto++
 CTPP
 D-Bus
 Database Management Library
 Dinkumware
 Effi (C++)
 Eigen (C++ library)
 GDAL
 GDCM
 GiNaC
 Gtkmm
 HOOPS 3D Graphics System
 Integrated Performance Primitives (IPP) — a multi-threaded software library of functions for multimedia and data processing applications, produced by Intel.
 Juce
 Kakadu (software)
 KFRlib - cross-platform, optimized audio and DSP library.
 LEMON (C++ library)
 LevelDB
 Libarc
 LibLAS
 Libsigc++
 Libx (graphics library)
 LiteSQL
 LIVE555
 Loki (C++)
 Math Kernel Library (MKL) — a library of optimized math routines for science, engineering, and financial applications, produced by Intel.
 Matrix Template Library
 Metakit
 Microsoft Foundation Class Library
 Object Windows Library
 Object-oriented Abstract Type Hierarchy
 ODB (C++)
 OGRE
 Open Asset Import Library
 Open Inventor
 OpenImageIO
 Oracle Template Library
 Orfeo toolbox
 POCO C++ Libraries
 Podofo
 Poppler (software)
 PTK Toolkit
 Qt (framework)
 Sound Object (SndObj) Library
 Stapl
 SymbolicC++
 Threading Building Blocks (TBB) — C++ template library developed by Intel Corporation for writing software programs that take advantage of multi-core processors.
 VTD-XML
 Windows Template Library
 WxWidgets
 Xcas
 Xerces
 YAAF

See also
 List of C++ multi-threading libraries
 List of C++ multiple precision arithmetic libraries
 List of C++ template libraries

History of C++ 

 History of C++
 Programming languages that influenced C++
 C
 Simula
 Ada 83
 ALGOL 68
 CLU
 ML
 Standardisation History
 C++98 — In 1998, the C++ standards committee standardized C++ and published the international standard ISO/IEC 14882:1998 (informally known as C++98).
 C++03
 C++11 — Approved by ISO as of 12 August 2011, replacing C++03. The name is derived from the tradition of naming language versions by the year of the specification's publication.
 C++14 — Most recent iteration of C++, announced by ISO on 18 August 2014, replacing C++11.
 C++17 - Upcoming version. The specification is feature complete, and is entering the review period.
 C++20

Example source code 

 Articles with example C++ code

C++ publications

Books about C++ 
 The C++ Programming Language — widely regarded as the standard textbook for the language. By Bjarne Stroustrup.
 The Design and Evolution of C++ — a book by Bjarne Stroustrup about the birth of C++.
 Modern C++ Design — a book by Andrei Alexandrescu on various design patterns using C++.

Magazines about C++ 
 C++ Report — was a bi-monthly professional computer magazine published by SIGS Publications Group.

C++ personalities 
 Alexander Stepanov
 Andrei Alexandrescu
 Andrew Koenig
 Bjarne Stroustrup– Danish computer scientist, most notable for the creation and development of C++.
 David Abrahams
 Douglas C. Schmidt
 Herb Sutter
 Jim Coplien (a.k.a. James O. Coplien)
 Pete Becker
 Robert Cecil Martin
 Scott Meyers

C++ dialects 
The C++ standardisation committee discourages dialects (with a preference that the problem is solved by new functionality in the standard library, as is done with items like multi-threading for parallel programming), however some dialects have been created, for various reasons (to remove features that are harder to implement, response to a programming trend, etc.):
 Programming language dialect — (relatively small) variation or extension of the language that does not change its intrinsic nature.
 Charm++ — parallel object-oriented programming language based on C++ and developed in the Parallel Programming Laboratory at the University of Illinois. Charm++ is designed with the goal of enhancing programmer productivity by providing a high-level abstraction of a parallel program while at the same time delivering good performance on a wide variety of underlying hardware platforms.
 Embedded C++ — dialect of C++ for embedded systems, built "to provide embedded systems programmers with a subset of C++ that is easy for the average C programmer to understand and use".
 Embedded system — computer system designed for specific control functions for a facility, machine, or device in which it is embedded as an integrated part of the product. Embedded systems control many devices in common use today.
 R++ — rule-based programming language developed by Bell Labs in the 1990s, based on C++.
 Sieve C++ Parallel Programming System — C++ compiler and parallel runtime designed and released by Codeplay that aims to simplify the parallelization of code so that it may run efficiently on multi-processor or multi-core systems.

C++ language extensions 
 AspectC++ — aspect-oriented extension of C and C++ languages.
 C++/CLI — Microsoft's language specification intended to supersede Managed Extensions for C++. It is a complete revision that aims to simplify the older Managed C++ syntax (which is now deprecated). C++/CLI is standardized by Ecma as ECMA-372. It is currently available only in Visual Studio 2005, 2008, 2010, 2012, 2013 and 2015 (also included in the Express Editions).
 Common Language Infrastructure — open specification developed by Microsoft and standardized by ISO and ECMA that describes the executable code and runtime environment that form the core of the Microsoft .NET Framework and the free and open source implementations Mono and Portable.NET.
 C++/CX — language extension for C++ compilers from Microsoft that enables C++ programmers to write programs for the new Windows Runtime platform, or WinRT. It brings a set of syntax and library abstractions that interface with the COM-based WinRT programming model in a way that is natural to native C++-programmers.
 Cilk Plus — multithreaded parallel computing extension of C and C++ languages.
 CUDA C/C++ — compiler and extensions for parallel computing using Nvidia graphics cards.
 Managed Extensions for C++ — deprecated Microsoft set of deviations from C++, including grammatical and syntactic extensions, keywords and attributes, to bring the C++ syntax and language to the .NET Framework. These extensions allowed C++ code to be targeted to the Common Language Runtime (CLR) in the form of managed code as well as continue to interoperate with native code. Superseded by C++/CLI.

See also 
 Outline of computer programming
 Outline of software
 Outline of software engineering

References

External links 

 
C++
C++